The Sunnehanna Amateur, officially the Sunnehanna Amateur Tournament for Champions, is a men's amateur golf tournament. Founded in 1954, it is hosted annually at the Sunnehanna Country Club in Johnstown, Pennsylvania, United States. It is considered to be one of the top amateur golf tournaments held in the United States and is classified as a Category A event by the World Amateur Golf Rankings.

The Sunnehanna Amateur is played in stroke play format; 72 holes (four rounds) held over four days. Many current and former PGA Tour, Champions Tour, Walker Cup and Ryder Cup players have competed in the tournament. Tiger Woods played in the tournament twice, finishing 5th in 1992 and tied for 12th in 1993.

In December 2021, the Sunnehanna Amateur joined with six other tournaments to form the Elite Amateur Golf Series.

Winners

2022 Bryce Lewis
2021 Trent Phillips
2020 Preston Summerhays
2019 Alex Smalley
2018 Alex Smalley
2017 Braden Thornberry
2016 Collin Morikawa
2015 Derek Bard
2014 Will Murphy
2013 Steven Ihm
2012 Bobby Wyatt
2011 Nathan Smith
2010 Bobby Hudson
2009 Kevin Foley
2008 Rickie Fowler
2007 Rickie Fowler
2006 Webb Simpson
2005 Michael Sim
2004 Jack Ferguson
2003 Matt Hendrix
2002 Dillard Pruitt
2001 Lucas Glover
2000 Edward Loar
1999 Edward Loar
1998 Steve Sheehan
1997 Duke Delcher
1996 Jeff Thomas
1995 John Harris
1994 Allen Doyle
1993 Jaxon Brigman
1992 Allen Doyle
1991 Paul Claxton
1990 Allen Doyle
1989 Allen Doyle
1988 Jay Sigel
1987 Greg Lesher
1986 Billy Andrade
1985 Scott Verplank
1984 Scott Verplank
1983 Dillard Pruitt
1982 Brad Faxon
1981 Jodie Mudd
1980 Bobby Clampett
1979 John Cook
1978 Jay Sigel
1977 John Cook
1976 Jay Sigel
1975 Jamie Gonzales
1974 Dave Strawn
1973 Ben Crenshaw
1972 Mark Hayes
1971 Bob Zender
1970 Howard Twitty
1969 Leonard Thompson
1968 Bobby Greenwood
1967 Bill Hyndman
1966 Jack Lewis Jr.
1965 Bobby Greenwood
1964 Gary Cowan
1963 Roger McManus
1962 Ed Updegraff
1961 Dick Siderowf
1960 Gene Dahlbender
1959 Tommy Aaron
1958 Bill Hyndman
1957 Joe Campbell
1956 Gene Dahlbender
1955 Hillman Robbins
1954 Don Cherry

References

External links

Amateur golf tournaments in the United States
Golf in Pennsylvania